James Iley (15 December 1935 – 17 November 2018) was an English football player and manager. He made nearly 550 appearances in the Football League playing as a left half. He was a brother-in-law to Jack and Colin Grainger.

Career
Born in South Kirkby, Iley played for Pontefract Collieries, Sheffield United, Tottenham Hotspur, Nottingham Forest, Newcastle United and Peterborough United. As manager, he took charge of Peterborough (as player-manager), Barnsley, Blackburn Rovers, Bury and Exeter City. He was capped once for England under-23 team, and twice by the Football League representative side.

References

1935 births
2018 deaths
People from South Kirkby
English footballers
England under-23 international footballers
Pontefract Collieries F.C. players
Sheffield United F.C. players
Tottenham Hotspur F.C. players
Nottingham Forest F.C. players
Newcastle United F.C. players
Peterborough United F.C. players
English Football League players
English Football League representative players
Association football wing halves
English football managers
Peterborough United F.C. managers
Barnsley F.C. managers
Blackburn Rovers F.C. managers
Bury F.C. managers
Exeter City F.C. managers
English Football League managers